Mikhaylovka is a rural locality (a village) in Burlinsky Selsoviet, Gafuriysky District, Bashkortostan, Russia. The population was 3 as of 2010. There is 1 street.

Geography 
Mikhaylovka is located 46 km north of Krasnousolsky (the district's administrative centre) by road. Yuzimyanovo is the nearest rural locality.

References 

Rural localities in Gafuriysky District